Between Broadway and Hollywood is an album by Argentine composer, pianist and conductor Lalo Schifrin recorded in 1963 and released on the MGM label.

Track listing
All compositions by Lalo Schifrin except as indicated
 "Days of Wine and Roses" (Henry Mancini, Johnny Mercer) - 4:40   
 "Theme From "Lawrence Of Arabia"" (Maurice Jarre) - 5:54   
 "Hallucinations" - 4:03   
 "Who Will Buy" (Lionel Bart) - 2:43   
 "Hud" (Elmer Bernstein) - 5:50   
 "She Loves Me" (Jerry Bock, Sheldon Harnick) - 3:25   
 "Jive Orbit" - 3:00   
 "Impressions of Broadway" - 4:03   
Recorded in New York City on May 27, (tracks 1, 4 & 8) and May 29 (tracks 2, 3 & 5-7), 1963

Personnel
Lalo Schifrin - piano
George Duvivier - bass
Ed Shaughnessy - drums

References

MGM Records albums
Lalo Schifrin albums
1963 albums
Albums produced by Creed Taylor
Albums arranged by Lalo Schifrin